S. A. Bari (1927–1987) was a Bangladesh Nationalist Party politician and former Deputy Prime Minister of Bangladesh.

Early life
Bari was born on 1927 in Dinajpur, East Bengal, British Raj. He was involved in student politics. Bari was the first vice president of Dhaka University Central Students' Union who was elected directly by the students' votes.

Career
Bari joined the Civil Liberty League in 1951. He was involved with the Bengali language movement and was imprisoned for it. He was arrested again in 1955. He helped found the East Pakistan Students Union and in 1951 became a founding member of Jubo League. He worked as a lawyer in Dinajpur bar. He helped found the Dinajpur Law College. He was active with the protests against military dictator General Ayub Khan. He helped organize the 1969 mass uprising. In 1971 after the start of Bangladesh Liberation war he joined the Mujib Bahini. He was made in-charge of Dalimga camp of Mujib Bahini. He supported National Awami Party, in 1977 he was secretary of the party. In 1979 he was elected to Parliament as a candidate of Bangladesh Nationalist Party. He served as the Minister of Manpower and Social Welfare in the cabinet of President Ziaur Rahman. He also served as the Deputy Prime Minister.

Death
Bari died on 3 March 1987.

References

Bangladesh Nationalist Party politicians
1927 births
1987 deaths
Deputy Prime Ministers of Bangladesh
2nd Jatiya Sangsad members